Lineostethus tenebricornis is a species of stink bug in the family Pentatomidae. It is found in Central America and North America.

References

Further reading

 

Pentatomidae
Articles created by Qbugbot
Insects described in 1957